Diggi Palace is an Indian royal palace located in Jaipur, Rajasthan. It was converted into a heritage hotel, but a part is still occupied by the royal family, which also runs the hotel. The annual Jaipur Literature Festival has been held here since 2006.

History
The former haveli belongs to the Thakurs (Khangarot Rajputs) of Diggi, a thikana or estate 40 km south-west from Jaipur, earlier part of the Jaipur state. Each of the thakurs since its construction in 1860s, added to the present structure, which in 1991 was partly converted to a heritage hotel by the present owners Thakur Ram Pratap Singh  Diggi and his wife, Jyotika Kumari Diggi. The history of Diggi Palace takes us to a journey back in the 19th century. Diggi Palace was built in 1860 by Shri Thakur Saheb Pratap Singh Ji Diggi of the then ruling family of Diggi principality presiding in the grand Diggi Fort. Going further down the years, the town of Jaipur was built in 9 squares. Diggi Palace occupied the space of present-day 'Albert Hall Museum' but was later shifted to its current location. In 1991, the palace was converted to a heritage hotel and was made open for public.

References

External links
 Official site

Houses completed in the 19th century
Tourist attractions in Jaipur
Royal residences in India
Palaces in Rajasthan
Heritage hotels in India
Hotels in Jaipur
History of Jaipur
Palaces in Jaipur